Brigadier Syed Ahmad Ali is a senior retired officer of the Indian Army. He was the ex- Pro-Vice Chancellor of Aligarh Muslim University, Eo: 16 May 2017. Currently, appointed as the Director of Jahangirabad Educational Institute of Technology.

Early life and education
Ahmad Ali was born on 10 August 1954 at Allahabad. His Father Late Syed Mahbub Ali was a social reformer, Zamindar. Ahmad Ali completed his primary education at St. Joseph's College, Allahabad from where he completed his Indian School Certificate in 1972. He did his Intermediate from Govt. Inter College, Allahabad. In 1976 graduation from Allahabad University. During his graduation, Ahmad Ali qualified the Combined Defence Services Exam conducted by UPSC. In 1976 he joined the Indian Army and was commissioned into the Infantry Kumaon Regiment in 1977.

He completed master's degree in Defence Studies (M.Sc. in Defence Studies) from Chennai University in 1990. In 2002 Masters in Management Sciences from Osmania University.

Military career
In 1976  he qualified Combined Defence Services Exam. After that he joined the Indian Army into the Infantry Kumaon Regiment in 1977. Brig Ahmad Ali is a recipient of Sena Medal for his distinguished services during Operation Vijay Kargil War.

Hobbies
Ahmad Ali a good tennis and golf player, his hobbies photography, reading and trekking and also keen hockey.

References

1954 births
Living people
 
Aligarh Muslim University
University of Allahabad alumni
Indian Army personnel
Osmania University alumni